Jade Mountain is a mythological mountain in Chinese mythology and the residence of The Queen Mother of the West.

Place
Jade Mountain should not be confused with any geographic places named Yushan. Also note, Jade Mountain and Feather Mountain are both important places in Chinese mythology, but the Chinese word yu in both cases has a different character.

It has been suggested that the mountain corresponds to a location in the Kunlun Mountains and that "jade mountain" is a common Chinese name to describe a snow-capped peak.

Background
Jade Mountain is mentioned in Chapter 2 of the Han Dynasty text Classic of Mountains and Seas as being the residence of the Queen Mother of the West. It is thought that Jade Mountain, along with the Queen Mother of the West, date back to much earlier; the 4th century BCE Zhuangzi also describes her residence as being on a mountain.

See also
 Kunlun Mountain: a mythical mountain, dwelling of various divinities, and fabulous plants and animals
 Mount Buzhou: mythical mountain
 Mount Penglai: paradise; a fabled fairy isle on the China Sea
 Moving Sands

References

Locations in Chinese mythology
Mythological mountains
Asia in mythology